Salavatlı (former Kurucular) is a town in Sultanhisar district of Aydın Province, Turkey. At   It is situated to the north of Turkish state highway  which connects Aydın to Sultanhisar. The population of the town was 1407 as of 2012. The settlement was founded in 1730 during Ottoman Empire era. In 1972 it was declared a seat of township. Major economic activity is farming. Main crops are figs, strawberries, olives, citrus and cotton. The ancient site of Acharaca is nearby.

References

Populated places in Aydın Province
Towns in Turkey
Sultanhisar District